The Battle of Izium was a military engagement between Russia and Ukraine that occurred as part of the Eastern Ukraine offensive during the 2022 Russian invasion of Ukraine. The battle started in March 2022 for control of the town of Izium due to the town's importance as a transportation node. The Russian military wanted to capture Izium so its forces in the Kharkiv Oblast could link up with their troops in the Donbas region.

On 10 September 2022, Ukrainian forces recaptured the town during the 2022 Ukrainian Kharkiv counteroffensive and local mass graves with 440 bodies were found. Izium's population decreased to just 10,000 due to the war.

Battle 

Some Russian attacks on Izium started taking place from 28 February 2022, with continued rocket strikes by the Russian military starting on 3 March. Eight civilians were killed on 3 March, with the town's central hospital reportedly sustaining significant damage. The following day, Russian forces advanced towards Izium and reached its northern outskirts. By 6 March, the Russian military was in control of two of Izium's neighborhoods and its railway station.

In the evening of 7 March, Russian online outlets reported that Izium had been taken by Russian forces, a claim that was not officially confirmed. The next day, fighting erupted between Russian and Ukrainian forces for control of the town, with Russian troops eventually being repelled. Between 9 and 10 March, 2,250 civilians were evacuated from Izium, while Russian forces continued to slowly advance towards the town.

On 12 March, Russian troops captured the northern part of the town. The following day, the Russian military made more advances, but were ultimately repelled, according to the Ukrainian military.

Sometime between 15 and 16 March, Russian troops seized the southern part of Izium, before Ukrainian forces managed to recapture their positions soon after. On 17 March, a US DoD official reported Izium was once again captured by Russian forces, but this was denied by the Institute for the Study of War (ISW). The Russian military crossed the Donets river near the Barvinkivsky Highway, but were then halted by Ukrainian forces after being ambushed. Fighting continued the next day.

Between 19 and 20 March, a new Russian attempt to capture the center of Izium was repelled. During the fighting, Russian engineering troops attempted to make a pontoon bridge over the Donets river, so to bypass two vehicle bridges that were partially destroyed by Ukrainian forces in an attempt to halt the Russian advance. However, the engineering troops were ambushed and 19 Russian soldiers were killed and 46 wounded. Among the dead was the commander of the engineering unit, Colonel Nikolay Ovcharenko. Eventually, Russian forces managed to erect two pontoon bridges and Russian tanks crossed the river to encircle the Ukrainian-held part of Izium. During this time, on 22 March, Ukrainian forces made an attempted counterattack to regain control of the town.

On 24 March, the Russian military announced that it had taken full control of Izium, which was denied by Ukraine which stated that fighting was still ongoing. According to a local official, Russian forces were holding the northern part of the town, while Ukrainian soldiers were in the south, with the Donets river separating them. He also confirmed that Izium was blockaded and that the city had been "completely destroyed" by this point.

On 25 March, it was reported by a US DoD official and others that Russian forces broke through Ukrainian lines to the south of Izium, reportedly advancing 10 kilometers. However, the ISW cited the Ukrainian military that the Russian troops were repelled at the village of Kamyanka, just south of Izium. The ISW further stated that Russian forces were going to continue with their attempts to encircle the town, after failing to capture it in a direct assault.

By 27 March, the Russian military captured Kamyanka and two other villages southwest and southeast of Izium, but Ukrainian forces claimed that they managed to subsequently recapture all three villages. They also claimed to have shot down a Russian Sukhoi Su-34 fighter aircraft near Izium. Two days later, it was confirmed Kamyanka was under Russian control, with Russian forces fortifying their positions around it, while the fighting moved south of Izium, along the road to Sloviansk.

On 1 April, the Ukrainian military confirmed Izium was under Russian control. The following day, in an interview for Ukrinform, Izium's Deputy Mayor Volodymyr Matsokin claimed that 80% of the city's residential buildings had been destroyed and that there was no power, heating, or water in the city.

Commander, leaders, and units involved
The Russian offensive was performed by the 1st Guards Tank Army under the command of Lt. General Sergei Kisel.  Other commanders and units within the 1st Guards include:
  27th Separate Guards Motor Rifle Brigade 
Col. Sergey Igorevich Safonov
  144th Guards Motor Rifle Division
 Maj. General Vitaly Sleptsov
  45th Engineer Regiment
 Colonel Nikolay Ovcharenko

Ukrainian formations involved included:
  81st Airmobile Brigade
  Territorial Defense Forces
  Dzhokhar Dudayev Battalion

Aftermath 

On 3 April, the Ukrainian government stated that two Russian soldiers were killed and 28 others hospitalized after Ukrainian civilians handed out poisoned cakes to Russian soldiers of the Russian 3rd Motor Rifle Division in Izium.

On 4 April, The Guardian reported, based on eyewitness reports by residents and military officials, that intense fighting continued close to Izium.

On 10 April, several US defense officials stated that Russian forces were massing in Izium in preparation for an offensive campaign between Izium and Dnipro. Russian forces had been reportedly redeploying forces from the Kyiv axis and the Sumy axis to Izium from 5 April.

On 18 April, Ukraine claimed the recapture of a "number of settlements" in or near the Izium area. Russian forces in the city were beginning mass deportations of city residents towards the territory of the Russian Federation.

Following the start of a new Russian offensive mid-April 2022, Russian troops had some success through localized advances south and southwest of Izium on 20 April. As of 26 April, Russian forces continued to make slow progress south of Izium, while the following day, the Russian military captured one town west of Izium, as well as the outskirts of another 20 kilometers west of the city.

On 27 April 2022, Ukrainian publication Defense Express claimed that Valery Gerasimov the Chief of General Staff of the Russian Army arrived in Izium to personally command the Russian offensive in the region. According to the Ukrainian Independent Information Agency, Gerasimov was wounded on 1 May 2022 near Izium. Two US officials confirmed Gerasimov had been in the region but a Ukrainian official denied Ukraine was specifically targeting Gerasimov and said that when the command post was attacked, with 200 Russian soldiers being killed, Gerasimov had already set off to return to Russia. Ukrainian officials claimed the attack killed Russian General Andrei Simonov.

On 4 June, the Ukrainians claimed to have largely destroyed the 35 Combined Arms Army south of Izium. According to CIT analyst Kyrylo Mykhailov, out of 1,500-2,000 infantrymen in its two brigades, only 100-200 were left.

On 25 June, the Ukrainians claimed that they had carried out a strike using the HIMARS. Ukrainian military said that during this strike over 40 soldiers were killed, including Colonel Andrei Vasilyev. The strike occurred on a Russian military base near Izium. Russia acknowledges the attack but says it hit a hospital and killed 2 civilians.

On 12 August, citing a report from Radio Free Europe/Radio Liberty, the Institute for the Study of War concluded that the 64th Separate Guards Motor Rifle Brigade had likely been destroyed as "part of an intentional Kremlin effort to conceal war crimes it committed in Kyiv Oblast." The report went further stating that of the 1,500 members of the brigade, losses were placed at 200-300 likely killed during fighting at Izium and Sloviansk, and that the unit "largely ceased to exist."

Ukraine began a counteroffensive in the Kharkiv region in early September 2022. By the morning of September 10, Russian forces, leaving their equipment, had withdrawn from the city which was now again under control of Ukrainian forces.

Civilian casualties 

Mass graves with more than 440 bodies were found after the Russians were driven out of the town.

In late November, a phone call from a Russian soldier in the 27th Separate Guards Motor Rifle Brigade discussing killing of Izium's citizens during the September retreat was leaked. The soldier detailed a secondhand account of where his commanding officer Colonel Sergey Igorevich Safonov and another officer had stabbed an elderly Ukrainian woman and shot her husband respectively, killing both.

References 

Izium
Izium
March 2022 events in Ukraine
April 2022 events in Ukraine
History of Kharkiv Oblast